= Theaterachse =

Theatre in Austria

Theaterachse is a theatre company in Austria. The company was founded in Salzburg in 1995.
